The Olympus E-450 (or Olympus EVOLT E-450 in North America) is a 10.0 megapixel digital single-lens reflex (DSLR) camera made by Olympus and conforming to the Four Thirds System standard. E-450 was announced in March 2009, and shipping started in May the same year. E-450 is similar in size to its siblings in the E-4XX series, marketed as the smallest DSLRs in the world.

Features
The E-450 is a slightly upgraded version of the E-420. The cameras are very similar - in fact, when the E-450 was announced the upgrades were considered notably few by reviewers. The main new features in the E-450:
Three Art Filters, where the camera processes the image to give it a new appearance. The filters available in E-450 are Pop Art, giving the image a very saturated look, Soft Focus making the images look "dreamy" similar to the effect of a diffusion filter on the lens, and Pin Hole, which gives a vignetting effect and makes the image look like it was taken by a pinhole camera.
TruePic III+ processor, an upgrade from the E-420 TruePic III processor.
Increased buffer for continuous shooting: the E-450 can buffer 8 RAW files compared to E-420's 6.
Improved luminance on the LCD screen.

As with its predecessors E-400, E-410 and E-420 the E-450 is notable for its portability, especially when coupled with the Olympus 25 mm f2.8 pancake lens. Its small size is achieved by omitting the side hand grip, in-body stabilisation, and larger battery featured in other Olympus dSLRs.

The E-450 uses Olympus' Supersonic Wave Filter to remove dust from the surface of the image sensor.

References

External links 

E-450 on Olympus America website

E-450
Live-preview digital cameras
Four Thirds System
Cameras introduced in 2009